Sandwich Technology School is a secondary school with academy status in Sandwich, Kent, England. The school is a non-selective school in a selective, grammar school area and serves a coastal and rural region, including an urban area that is subject to much regeneration, and some isolated villages. The school was rated as 'Good' by Ofsted in May 2019. The school name is often shortened by locals to 'Sandwich Tech' or 'STS'. The school motto is 'Hold fast that which is good'.

History
It was founded in May 1935 and admitted 380 children born from 1921 to 1923. The school currently enrols 1400 students and the current Headteacher is Mrs Tracey Savage. The school was formerly known as Sandwich Secondary School.

About the School
STS is an over-subscribed, 11 to 19, mixed, secondary school with specialist technology college status.

School accommodation and resources include a Sports and Leisure Centre, Tennis Courts and a floodlit Artificial Turf Pitch (all of which are open for community use), an Open Learning Centre (joint library and computer room), a drama studio, science and technology rooms and a construction centre.

There is an extensive ICT network linking all classrooms on the campus.

References

External links
Sandwich Technology School website

Secondary schools in Kent
Academies in Kent
Specialist technology colleges in England